Graphics DDR SDRAM (GDDR SDRAM) is a type of synchronous dynamic random-access memory (SDRAM) specifically designed for applications requiring high bandwidth, e.g. graphics processing units (GPUs). GDDR SDRAM is distinct from the more widely known types of DDR SDRAM, such as DDR4, although they share some of the same features—including double data rate data transfers. , GDDR SDRAM has been succeeded by GDDR2, GDDR3, GDDR4, GDDR5, GDDR5X, GDDR6, and GDDR6X.

Generations

DDR SGRAM
GDDR was initially known as DDR SGRAM (double data rate synchronous graphics RAM). It was commercially introduced as a 16Mb memory chip by Samsung Electronics in 1998.

GDDR2
Main article: DDR2 SDRAM

GDDR3

GDDR4

GDDR5

GDDR6

Table of transfer rates

See also 
 Video random access memory
 Double data rate

References

SDRAM
Graphics cards
South Korean inventions